The women's 400 metres at the 2010 European Athletics Championships was held at the Estadi Olímpic Lluís Companys on 28 and 30 July.

Medalists

Records

Schedule

Results

Round 1

Heat 1

Heat 2

Heat 3

Summary

Final

References
 Round 1 Results
 Final Results
Full results

400
400 metres at the European Athletics Championships
2010 in women's athletics